Brinkworth may refer to: 

Brinkworth (surname)
Brinkworth, South Australia
Brinkworth, Wiltshire, United Kingdom